John Pankratz (born June 23, 1957) is a Canadian former professional football player who was a wide receiver in the Canadian Football League (CFL) for the BC Lions for eight seasons.

References

Career stats

1957 births
Living people
Canadian football slotbacks
Canadian football wide receivers
BC Lions players
Simon Fraser Clan football players
Players of Canadian football from British Columbia
Canadian football people from Vancouver